Tim Charles Phillips (born July 7, 1966 Sacramento, California) is an American investment manager, political activist and philanthropist. He is the founder and CEO of Phillips & Company, one of Portland, Oregon's largest investment firms. He has appeared in the news media numerous times over the years to share his insight and analysis on the state of the US economy and its impact on investors. Phillips, his wife Kristen and their two children currently live in the Portland area.

Political life

Phillips is an active member of the Oregon Republican Party. He once ranked 23rd on a list of the 50 Most Influential Political Figures in the State of Oregon. After his unsuccessful bid to become the Republican candidate for Congress in 2004, Phillips and fellow party member Ron Saxton formed the Oregon Leadership Roundtable, with the intent bringing together Republicans to figure out how to reverse the party's decline in the state. Saxton ran for Governor of Oregon in 2006, only to be defeated by Democrat Ted Kulongoski.

Community involvement

Phillips served as the board chairman of the Children's Cancer Association (CCA) and also serves on the OHSU Cancer Council. He is also a Regent at Pepperdine University and serves on their endowment committee.

As an enthusiastic advocate for community involvement, Phillips has encouraged volunteerism within his company. He encourages employees to volunteer with their favorite organizations and directs the company to support such causes as the YMCA, Portland Art Museum, CCA, OHSU Foundation, and Orphans Overseas.

Education

Phillips received a Bachelor's degree from Pepperdine University in 1987. He currently serves on the university's Board of Regents and the Endowment Committee.

References

External links
 Phillips & Company page

American chief executives of financial services companies
Philanthropists from Oregon
Living people
1966 births
Businesspeople from Sacramento, California
Businesspeople from Oregon
Oregon Republicans
Pepperdine University alumni